Alberto (V) d'Este (27 February 1347 – 30 July 1393) was lord of Ferrara and Modena from 1388 until his death.

He was associated in the lordship of the House of Este by his brother Niccolò in 1361, becoming the sole ruler of Ferrara and Modena after the latter's death in 1388.  He was the son of Obizzo III d'Este, Marquis of Ferrara, who had ruled in Ferrara from 1317 to 1352.

Alberto founded the University of Ferrara in 1391. In the same year he married Giovanna de' Roberti (d. 1393). After her death, he married his mistress Isotta Albaresani.

He was succeeded by his legitimated son Niccolò (III).

References
 L. A. Muratori. Delle antichità Estensi. 1717, Modena;
 G. B. Pigna. Historia dei Principi d'Este. 1570, Ferrara.
 Antonio Menniti Ippolito, Este, Alberto V d', in Dizionario Biografico degli Italiani, XLIII, Roma 1993, pp. 295–297.

1347 births
1393 deaths
Alberto 5
Alberto 5
14th-century Italian nobility